Michael Sullivan (1809 – 1878) was an Irish Liberal, Independent Irish Party and Repeal Association politician, and a merchant.

Sullivan was elected Repeal Association Member of Parliament (MP) for Kilkenny City at a by-election in 1847—held because John O'Connell, who had been elected for the seat at the 1847 general election, had opted to sit for Limerick City where he had also been elected. Becoming an Independent Irish candidate in 1852, and a Liberal in 1859, Sullivan held the seat until 1865, when he did not seek re-election.

Sullivan was High Sheriff of County Kilkenny in 1870.

References

External links
 

1809 births
1878 deaths
High Sheriffs of County Kilkenny
Members of the Parliament of the United Kingdom for County Kilkenny constituencies (1801–1922)
Irish Repeal Association MPs
Irish Liberal Party MPs
UK MPs 1847–1852
UK MPs 1852–1857
UK MPs 1857–1859
UK MPs 1859–1865